Men's Giant Slalom World Cup 1969/1970

Final point standings

In men's Giant Slalom World Cup 1969/70 the best 3 results count. Deductions are given in brackets. Gustav Thöni won the cup with maximum points.

References
 fis-ski.com

Men's Giant Slalom
FIS Alpine Ski World Cup men's giant slalom discipline titles